Fairburn is a small village and civil parish in the Selby District of North Yorkshire, England.

Situated approximately 10 miles (16 km) to the east of Leeds, the village lies close to the A1(M) motorway and the M62 motorway and until 2005, when the A1(M) motorway was opened, Fairburn was divided in two by the old A1 and the two sides of the village were connected by just one vehicle bridge and one pedestrian footbridge, both of which have subsequently been removed.

The village was historically part of the West Riding of Yorkshire until 1974.

Overview

The village sits on the eastern edge of a narrow ridge of southern magnesian limestone which runs from near Worksop in the south to near Richmond in the north. The geology gives rise to a particularly flower rich limestone grassland which still exists in areas unsuitable for cultivation, whilst alluvial soils and clays are found in the river valley bottoms. This outcrop of limestone has been used to construct many of the older houses in the village.

Fairburn Ings Nature Reserve
Adjacent to the village is Fairburn Ings Nature Reserve, with a Visitor Centre.

Notable residents
William Jessop, one of the most prolific engineers of the canal age, was living in Fairburn with his wife Sarah in 1781, as their second son Josias was baptised there on 26 October. They left to move to Newark two or three years later, and Josias went on to become a civil engineer in his own right.

Bibliography

References

External links

Brief History of Fairburn
  Fairburn was in this parish

Civil parishes in North Yorkshire
Selby District
Villages in North Yorkshire